Grammoechus spilotus is a species of beetle in the family Cerambycidae. It was described by Charles Joseph Gahan in 1906. It is known from Malaysia.

References

Pteropliini
Beetles described in 1906